Komsomolsk is a rural locality (a village) in Tselinny Selsoviet, Khaybullinsky District, Bashkortostan, Russia. The population was 302 as of 2010. There are 9 streets.

Geography 
Komsomolsk is located 48 km northeast of Akyar (the district's administrative centre) by road. Valitovo is the nearest rural locality.

References 

Rural localities in Khaybullinsky District